National Tertiary Route 920, or just Route 920 (or ) is a National Road Route of Costa Rica, located in the Guanacaste province.

Description
In Guanacaste province the route covers Nicoya canton (San Antonio district), Santa Cruz canton (Bolsón, Diriá districts), Carrillo canton (Filadelfia district).

References

Highways in Costa Rica